Praski Vitti (Vitaly Petrov; born September 17, 1936 in Vurnarsky District, Chuvash Autonomous Soviet Socialist Republic, USSR) is a Chuvash artist, painter and muralist.

As well as being an honored artist of the RSFSR, he also holds: People's Artist of the Chuvash Republic, Member of the National Academy of Sciences and Arts of the Chuvash Republic, Laureate of State Prize of the Chuvash Republic of the Peter Egorov, and Professor at Chuvash State Pedagogical University.

Biography 
Vitaly Petrov was born September 17, 1936 as Petrol Vitaly Petrovich in Algazino, a village of the Vurnarsky District of the Chuvash Autonomous Soviet Socialist Republic (USSR).

He experienced many hardships in military time, starved, worked in the rear to the front.

Vitti was educated at the Cheboksary Art School, then went to study at the Vera Mukhina Higher School of Art and Design.

He illustrated pearl Chuvash literature - a poem Konstantin Ivanov.

He also illustrated the poems of the poet Andrei Voznesensky.

Participation in exhibitions 
Since the mid-1970s, Vitti has had works exhibited in the German Democratic Republic, Bulgaria, Hungary, Poland, Spain, United States, West Germany, India, Japan, Turkey.

His works are kept in museums and private collections around the world.

Exhibitions

Personal showing 
 1984, 1987, 1993, 1996 «Graphic poetry» — Chuvash State Art Museum (Cheboksary)
 1990 «K. Ivanov’s  World Poetry» (Moscow)
 1993, 1996 — Showroom,  Novocheboksarsk
 1995 «Finding new homeland Hungarians» — Chuvash State Institute of Humanities (Cheboksary)
 2011 — Chuvash State Art Museum (Cheboksary)

Participation in exhibitions 
 II International Exhibition of enamel art (Moscow, 1991)
 International Exhibition of enamels (Covington, Kentucky, United States, 1991)
 International creative center enamel (Kecskemet, Hungary)
 Enamels and exhibition graphics (Budapest, 1992)
 Berlin (1993, 1994, 1996, 1998)
 International Exhibition (Yaroslavl, 1995), St. Petersburg (1995), Peterhof (1995)
 Tokyo (1996)
 Moscow (1997)
 Paris (1999)
 Troyes (France, 2002)
 Barcelona (Spain, 2002)

Awards and honors 
 The first prize of the international creative center enamel (Kecskemet, Hungary)
 Diploma of the International Exhibition in Salou (Spain)
 Chuvashia State Prize of the Peter Egorov
 Diploma III Moscow international exhibition of enamel art
 Award of the President of the Russian Federation in the field of literature and art
 Order of Friendship

References

Literature 
 Davydov–Anatri, V., "Тавах Праски Виттине" , Хыпар. – 1997, кӑрлач, 29.
 Zorsky, Kh. "Халӑх сӑнарӗ – илем ҫутинче", Ялав. – 1996. – № 5. – С. 93.
 Krasnov, V., "Чӑваша тӗнчене каларакан", Тӑван Атӑл, 1997. – № 9. – С. 67.
 Kuzmin, V., "Праски Витти кӗвви", Хыпар. – 1996. – юпа, 3.
 Praski, V. «Анне портречӗ – Барселонӑра, Хыпар. – 1997, кӑрлач, 30.
 Praski, V. "Саккӑрмӗш хут пулчӗ", Н. Смирнова ҫырса илнӗ, Хыпар. – 1998, ҫурла, 19.
 Praski, V. «Юлнӑ кунсене халӑхӑмӑршӑн ирттерӗп», Хыпар. – 1996, авӑн, 7.
 Semenov, A., "Германи посольствинче – Праски Витти ӗҫӗсем", Хыпар, 1997, нарӑс, 1.
 Smirnova, N., "Праски Витти Турцирен тавранчӗ", Хыпар, 1999, ҫӗртме, 8.
 Tevetkel, M., "Праски Витти художнике саламласа ҫырнӑ шӳт,Ҫамрӑксен хаҫачӗ, 1997, авӑн, 27 (№ 39). – С. 8.
 Aleksin, V. Испанский дебют чувашского мастера / В. Алексин // Совет. Чувашия. – 1997. – 6 авг.
 Aleksin, V. Париж, конечно, не Чандрово, но и там говорят по–чувашски / В. Алексин // Совет. Чувашия. – 1999. – 30 дек.
 Arapov, V. Выставка, радующая всех нас / В. Арапов // Чӑваш ен. – 1996. – 30 нояб. – 7 дек. (№ 47). – С. 8.
 Viktorov, Y. Колесо – символ вечного движения / Ю. Викторов // Совет. Чувашия. – 1995. – 15 дек.
 Viktorov, Y. Обжигающая кисть / Ю. Викторов // Совет. Чувашия. – 1993. – 23 апр.
 Gordeeva, S. Модель мира в работах художника / С. Гордеева // Чӑваш ен. – 1997. – 12–19 июля (№ 28). – С. 4.
 Егоров, А. Праски Вити рисует жаркие стихи / А. Егоров // Жизнь. – 2001. – 24–30 июля (№ 30). – С. 16.
 Испанские «каникулы» художника // Республика. – 2003. – 13 авг. (№ 32). – С. 5.
 Макшанова, Е. Картины, на которых оживают легенды / Е. Макшанова // Чебоксар. новости. – 1994. – 22 дек.
 Он и в Венгрии свой человек // Совет. Чувашия. – 2004. – 12 марта.
 Осипова, Н. Чувашский народный художник получил международную премию / Н. Осипова // Чӑваш ен. – 1999. – 31 июля –7 авг. (№ 30). – С. 1.
 Праски, В. В Кечкемете, на волнах вдохновения, Республика. – 2003. – 29 окт. (№ 43). – С. 6.
 Праски, В. «Я рисую канонический образ чувашей...», Современ. Чувашия. – 2004. – 25 нояб. – С. 1, 4.
 Праски, В. По национальности – художник, Республика. – 2000. – 1 сент. (№ 35). – С. 4.
 Праски, В. «Теперь уж – настоящий художник»,; беседовала И. Пушкина // Ульяновец. – 2000. – 14 янв.
 Трофимов, А. Древо большого искусства, Совет. Чувашия. – 1986. – 17 сент.
 Тьваш, М. Праски Витти – художник и ученый, Молодеж. курьер. – 1996. – 13 сент. (№ 37). – С. 12.
 Убасси, С. Уход в символ, Лик Чувашии. – 1994. – № 3. – С. 147.
 Шамбулина, А. Праски Витти : «В семье никогда не видел обмана и грубости...» / А. Шамбулина // Ульяновец. – 2001. – 7 июня.

Links 
 
 Праски Виттипе Нарспи тапхăрне çулçӳрев — Интервью в газете «Питĕр чăвашĕсем».
 Praski Vitti, Forum Discussion
 Anniversary of Praski Vitti
 
 о Праски Витти, на сайте ЧГУ им. И. Н. Ульянова
 Praski Vitti. My journey in artists
 «I am an artist of dying people...»
 Two leap into space
 Praski Vitti in YouTube
 Вышел в свет альбом «Праски Витти. Живопись, эмаль, графика, монументальное искусство»
  Праски Виттин куравĕнче çĕнĕ альбома хаклĕç

1936 births
20th-century Russian painters
Russian male painters
21st-century Russian painters
Soviet painters
Chuvash people
Living people
20th-century Russian male artists
21st-century Russian male artists